The 1947–48 season was the 68th season of competitive football by Rangers.

Overview
Rangers played a total of 45 competitive matches during the 1947–48 season. This was the second official season played since the end of the Second World War. The club played in the Scottish League Division A and finished Runners up to Hibernian, with 46 points.

The club were knocked out the League Cup by Falkirk 1–0 at the Semi-Final stage.

The Scottish Cup campaign ended in success as the club beat Morton 1–0 in a replay in front of a crowd of 129,176 (a record for a midweek match). Williamson scored the winner in extra time.

Benfica were beaten 3–0 in a prestigious friendly match in Portugal.

Transfers 
18 December 1947:
Willie Dougal to Preston North End.

Results
All results are written with Rangers' score first.

Scottish League Division A

Scottish Cup

League Cup

Appearances

See also
 1947–48 in Scottish football
 1947–48 Scottish Cup
 1947–48 Scottish League Cup

References 

Rangers F.C. seasons
Rangers